The 2020 Oklahoma House of Representatives election took place as part of the biennial 2020 United States state legislative elections. Oklahoma voters elected state representatives in all 101 House districts. State Representatives serve two-year terms in the Oklahoma House of Representatives.

Republicans went into the 2020 election with a supermajority of seats in the state House over Democrats: 77 (R) to 24 (D). To take control, Democrats needed a net gain of 27 seats.

Following the 2020 election, Republicans expanded their supermajority by a net gain of 5 seats, shifting the balance of power to 82 (R) to 19 (D).

Flipped Seats
Five seats flipped party in 2020. Those flips were all losses for Democrats and wins for Republicans.

Republican Gains
District 4: Matt Meredith (D) to Bob Ed Culver Jr. (R)
District 7: Ben Loring (D) to Steve Bashore (R)
District 56: David Perryman (D) to Dick Lowe (R)
District 83: Chelsey Branham (D) to Eric Roberts (R)
District 95: Kelly Albright (D) to Max Wolfley (R)

Retirements
Nine incumbents did not run for re-election in 2020. Those incumbents were:

Republicans
District 1: Johnny Tadlock: Retiring
District 28: Zack Taylor: Retiring
District 52: Charles Ortega: Retiring
District 57: Harold Wright: Retiring
District 59: Mike Sanders: Retiring
District 96: Lewis H. Moore: Retiring

Democrats
District 7: Ben Loring: Retiring
District 56: David Perryman: Retiring
District 89: Shane Stone: Retiring
NOTE: In district 7, Ben Loring (D) retired and did not seek re-election. The only candidate who filed to run in district 7 was Republican Steve Bashore, guaranteeing a flip of control of the seat from Democrats to Republicans.

Incumbents Defeated in Primary Elections
Three incumbents were defeated in their party primaries in 2020. Those incumbents were:

Republicans
District 3: Lundy Kiger: Lost to Rick West

District 11: Derrel Fincher: Lost to Wendi Stearman

Democrat
District 88: Jason Dunnington: Lost to Mauree Turner

Incumbents Defeated in General Elections
Three incumbents were defeated in the 2020 general election. Those incumbents were all Democrats.
District 3: Matt Meredith (D): Lost to Bob Ed Culver Jr. (R)
District 83: Chelsey Branham (D): Lost to Eric Roberts (R)
District 95: Kelly Albright (D): Lost to Max Wolfley (R)

Predictions

Detailed Results

Official primary results can be obtained here, official primary run-off election results here, and official general election results here.

Closest races 
Seats where the margin of victory was under 10%:
 
  gain 
 
 
  gain

See also
2020 Oklahoma elections
2020 Oklahoma Senate election
2020 United States presidential election in Oklahoma
2020 United States Senate election in Oklahoma
2020 United States House of Representatives elections in Oklahoma

References

House
Oklahoma House
Oklahoma House of Representatives elections